William Compton may refer to:

William Compton (fl. 1416), MP for Nottinghamshire
William Compton (courtier) (1482–1528), courtier to Henry VIII
William Compton (The Tudors), a fictionalized portrayal in The Tudors
William Compton, 1st Earl of Northampton (died 1630), English peer
William Compton (army officer) (1625–1663), Royalist army officer
William Compton, 4th Marquess of Northampton (1818–1897), British peer and naval commander
William Compton, 5th Marquess of Northampton (1851–1913), British peer and Liberal politician
William Compton, 6th Marquess of Northampton (1885–1978), British peer and soldier
William Edward Compton (1945–1977), American radio personality
Will Compton (born 1989), American football linebacker
Bill Compton (1945–2007), mental health advocate
Bill Compton (The Southern Vampire Mysteries), a love interest of Sookie Stackhouse in the Southern Vampire series by Charlaine Harris and its television adaptation True Blood
Several Compton baronets

See also
Compton (surname)
William Crompton (disambiguation)